The 1929 election for Mayor of Los Angeles took place on June 9, 1929. Incumbent George E. Cryer chose not contest the election and retire from office, making it the first open seat since 1911. The race was won by John Clinton Porter, who defeated Councilman William G. Bonelli, John R. Quinn, and 11 other candidates.

Municipal elections in California, including Mayor of Los Angeles, are officially nonpartisan; candidates' party affiliations do not appear on the ballot.

Background 
Because of accusations of corruption and the straining of Mayor Cryer's relationship with Kent Kane Parrot, Parrot leaked to the Los Angeles Record that he would not seek re-election.  Cryer himself announced that he would not run for re-election in late February 1929. Democratic John Clinton Porter and Republican William G. Bonelli both campaigned for the office, as well as Republican John R. Quinn, Democratic councilmember Charles J. Colden, and President of the Los Angeles City Council Boyle Workman.

Bonelli was criticized during his campaign for sending an appeal for votes and an attack on Chief James E. Davis and the Police Commission.

Results

References and footnotes

External links
 Office of the City Clerk, City of Los Angeles

1929
Los Angeles
1929 California elections
1929 in Los Angeles